The Boston mayoral election of 1991 occurred on Tuesday, November 5, 1991, between Mayor Raymond Flynn and Edward J. Doherty, president of the Boston Teachers Union. Flynn was re-elected to his third term.

The nonpartisan municipal preliminary election was held on September 24, 1991.

Candidates
Edward J. Doherty, president of the Boston Teachers Union
Raymond Flynn, Mayor of Boston since 1983, member of the Boston City Council from 1978 to 1984, and state representative from 1971 to 1979.

Candidates eliminated in preliminary
Graylan Ellis-Hagler, community activist and pastor.

Results

See also
List of mayors of Boston, Massachusetts

References

Mayoral election
Boston mayoral
Boston
Mayoral elections in Boston
Non-partisan elections